Vitásek is a Czech surname. The female form is Vitásková. Notable people with the surname include:

Jan August Vitásek (1770–1839), Czech composer
Kate Vitasek (born 1968), American author and educator
Petr Vitásek (born 1981), Czech rower
Ondřej Vitásek, Czech ice hockey player

Czech-language surnames